The 1953 London to Christchurch air race, the "Last Great Air Race", was  long, from London Airport (now London Heathrow) to Christchurch International Airport in New Zealand, and took place in October 1953 after Christchurch declared their airport as international in 1950. It was intended to mark the centenary of Christchurch, and 50 years since the Wright brothers' first powered flight.

Race description

Canterbury International Air Race Council was formed in Christchurch in 1948 to plan the race, together with the British Royal Aero Club. It was divided into an outright Speed Section, and a Handicap Section for commercial transport aircraft types. Each plane was allowed to select its own route, as long as it was generally south-east, and any necessary intermediate stops. Several planes dropped out before it started.

The 3 commercial propeller-driven planes took off at 5 minute intervals, starting at 16:30 GMT on Thursday 8th October. The 5 military jet bombers followed at 5 minute intervals, starting at 17:35. The time in New Zealand was 12 hours ahead, as British Summer Time had ended 4 days earlier, and New Zealand didn't use it then. The starting time of the jets was delayed by an hour, to avoid a photo finish in the dark, about 24 hours later. Each plane was allowed 168 hours of elapsed time from the final plane's takeoff.

The planes flew direct from London to the Middle East, except the DC-6 (via Rome) and the Hastings (via Athens). After that, most of the routes were broadly similar, flying in almost a straight line via Ceylon, Cocos (Keeling) Islands and southern Australia. Canberra number "1" even managed to fly past Cocos without stopping. However, the DC-6 flew further north, via Karachi (West Pakistan), Burma, Indonesia and northern Australia. A great circle route would have been a few hundred miles shorter, over Finland and Japan.

The prizes for each Section were the same: 1st £10,000; 2nd £3000; 3rd £1000; 4th £500. These are New Zealand pounds, which matched UK pounds at the time. The Handicap Section, rather than a race, was intended to be a trial based on a formula aimed at rewarding commercial efficiency over a long-haul route.

The Speed Section was won by a Royal Air Force English Electric Canberra PR.3 flown by Flight Lieutenant Roland (Monty) Burton and navigated by Flight Lieutenant Don Gannon. The plane touched down at Christchurch (Harewood) Airport at 05:36 local time during a heavy storm, 41 minutes ahead of its closest rival, after , including 83 minutes on the ground; to this day, the record has not been broken. The Harewood Gold Cup was awarded to the winners, and the prize of £10,000 was paid to the RAF Benevolent Fund. Second in the Speed Section was Squadron Leader Peter Raw of No. 1 Long Range Flight RAAF in an Australian-built Canberra.

The Canberras were all fitted with extra fuel tanks in the bomb bays. To deal with the extra weight, the two PR3 planes' engines were tweaked to give more thrust, and larger main-wheel hubs and brakes fitted.

The wingtip fuel tanks now seen on the displayed WE139 were added later.

In the transport Handicap Section, a BEA Vickers Viscount finished first, followed by a Douglas DC-6A of KLM Royal Dutch Airlines which was declared the winner on handicap. A Royal New Zealand Air Force Handley Page Hastings also took part. The Viscount was fitted with extra fuel tanks in place of seats, enabling it to fly in 5 stages, as opposed to 8 for the DC-6; the Hastings had also expected to fly in 8 stages.

The Douglas DC-6A carried 64 passengers, including many Dutch women emigrating to marry or join their husbands. There was a previous Dutch "bride flight" in July 1952, which is sometimes confused with this one. Some widely circulated photographs, which claim to show the Douglas plane used for the race, actually show the same passengers departing from Schiphol (Amsterdam) or arriving in London, prior to the race, on a Douglas DC-6B, as painted next to the door. The race plane was labelled "DC-6A", and was built as a dual-purpose or convertible plane, with some seats, and cargo doors. It carried the name "DR. IR. M.H. DAMME", together with "TRADE WINGS" behind the rear left door, and a large number "21" on each side. Dokter Ingenieur Marinus H. Damme was a Dutch engineer, aviation businessman and politician. DC-6 planes were called "Liftmaster" originally.

The Handley Page Hastings carried cargo for the New Zealand Air Force. After stopping at Athens (Greece), Shaibah (near Basra, Iraq) and Masirah Island (Oman), an engine was ruined while landing at Negombo (Ceylon) during a storm, causing the plane to withdraw from the race. The Hastings has been described as the world's last four-engine tail-wheel transport giant.

The Vickers Viscount was loaned from the British Ministry of Supply to BEA, with BEA livery applied, and named "R M A Endeavour", after Australian businessman and aviator Reginald Myles Ansett, and Captain James Cook's ship HMS Endeavour. It made 4 stops, averaging only 18 minutes each, at Bahrain, Negombo, Cocos and Essendon (Melbourne, Australia). However, its lack of passengers and cargo led to it being declared second for this Section, behind the DC-6.

Competitors

Speed Section

Handicap Section

In popular culture
The film Bride Flight was released in 2008.

Notes

External links 
 British Pathe, 12,000 Mile Air Race 1953
 British Pathe, London - Christchurch Air Race 1953, prizes awarded
 Christchurch Video Camera Club, 1953 London to Christchurch Air Race, 1997. Scroll down for video; invents a Viscount stop at Athens, using Christchurch footage; then shows a non-race wingtip-tank/pod Canberra.

Air races
1953 in London
London to Christchurch air race
1953 in aviation
October 1953 events in the United Kingdom
October 1953 events in New Zealand